OH-22 may refer to:
Ohio's 22nd congressional district
Ohio's 22nd senatorial district
U.S. Route 22 in Ohio, the only Ohio highway numbered 22 since 1927
Ohio State Route 22 (1923-1927)